

V01A Allergens

V01AA Allergen extracts
V01AA01 Feather
V01AA02 Grass pollen
V01AA03 House dust mites
V01AA04 Mould fungus and yeast fungus
V01AA05 Tree pollen
V01AA07 Insects
V01AA08 Food
V01AA09 Textiles
V01AA10 Flowers
V01AA11 Animals
V01AA20 Various

References

V01